Castellón de la Plana (officially in ), or simply Castellón is the capital city of the province of Castellón, in the Valencian Community, Spain. It is located in the east of the Iberian Peninsula, on the Costa del Azahar (or Costa dels Tarongers) by the Mediterranean Sea. The mountain range known as Desert de les Palmes rises inland north of the town.

According to the 2018 census, Castellón has a population of 174,264 inhabitants (called castellonencs in Valencian), ranking as the fourth most populated city in the Valencian Community (after Valencia, Alicante and Elche). The Prime Meridian, or Greenwich Meridian, intersects the 40th parallel at Castellón de la Plana and is commemorated with a monolith in Meridian Park (Parc del Meridià) located at the exact point where this occurs.

History
The town inherited the name from a Moorish castle on the top of the hill of Magdalena (the ), a  dominating over a demarcation roughly consisting of the current-day municipalities of Castellón and Almassora. The area capitulated to James I of Aragon in 1233. This was followed by a series of attempts to create new settlements in the area starting with the alqueria of Benimahomet, the first Christian project to leave the castle, with mixed results. Following the 1247 mudéjar revolt, James I decreed the expulsion of the mudéjares from the area in 1248. The current settlement was however not founded until the 1250s, after James I, on 8 September 1251, granted Ximén Pérez d'Arenós a privilege authorising him to move from the castle to a new unspecified place in the plains (plana). Tradition claims that the move was completed by the third Sunday of Lent, 1252.

During the Middle Ages, the city was protected by moats, walls and towers, and a church was built, later becoming a cathedral. 

In the 16th century the town was one of the last strongholds in the Revolta de les Germanies (local guilds). It also supported Archduke Charles of Austria in the War of the Spanish Succession (1701–14), but was later taken by the troops of Philip d'Anjou.

In the 19th century, the city walls were torn down and it slowly began to expand, a process interrupted by the War of Independence against Napoleon (1804–14) and the Carlist Wars (1833–63). In 1833 Castelló became the capital of the newly constituted province. In the second half of the 19th century, the city again began to expand, marked by the arrival of the railway, the enlargement of the port and the construction of representative buildings (Provincial Hospital, Casino, Theater) and parks.

In 1991 a university (Jaume I University) was established, set upon a modern campus. The local economy is based on industry, tourism and craft-work.

Geography and Climate 

Castellón de la Plana has a Semi-arid climate (Köppen: BSk) with mild winters and hot, dry summers. Autumn is the wettest season and the average sunshine hours are around 2,800 per year.

Main sights 
Most of the historical buildings are located in the diminutive old town, around the Plaça Major (Main Square). These include:
 The Concatedral de Santa Maria (co-cathedral of Saint Mary), built in a Gothic-style in the 13th century and reconstructed one century later after destruction by fire. The present building is another reconstruction after the demolition ordered by the council during the Spanish civil war (1936).
 The Ajuntament (City Hall), erected at the beginning of the 18th century. It features a Tuscan-style façade rising up over a colonnade.
The free-standing bell-tower of the procathedral, known as El Fadrí (the single man), built in the 15th century.
 The Llotja del Cànem (Hemp Exchange Market), built during the first half of the 17th century to be used by traders in hempen cloth and ropes, a very important activity in the area at the time. Today the building is used by the University for cultural events and temporary exhibitions.
 On the northeast edge of the town, at the end of a broad avenue decorated with orange trees, stands the Basílica of Santa Maria del Lledó (European Hackberry or Celtis australis), a basilica devoted to an image of the Virgin Mary found in 1366 by a farmer when he was ploughing his lands. The original 14th-century chapel was extended to its present Baroque form during the 16th century.
 Espai d'Art Contemporani de Castelló, Museum for Modern Art
 Teatre Principal

Events
The annual festivities in Castellón are a week of celebrations three weeks before Easter every year called La Magdalena. People come from all over the province and many international bands and groups participate.

The city is famous for its music festivals, among which we find: early in February the Tanned Tin music festival for alternative music and experimental music, in July the Festival Internacional de Benicàssim (also known as FIB, which translates to Benicàssim's International Festival), at the beginning of August there is the Arenal Sound and during the middle of that same month, we can find the Rototom Sunsplash Festival, known for its reggae music.

Sports
The city has the professional basketball team AB Castelló, which plays in LEB Oro, Spanish second basketball division.

The local professional football club is CD Castellón, which currently plays in the Primera RFEF (Spanish third division). It holds home games at Nou Estadi Castàlia, which has a capacity of 15,500 seats. Despite its stadium and social support, the club financial problems and unstable history brought it to play in semi-pro and amateur regional divisions, not playing in La Liga since the 1990–91 season. On 21 March 2018, Castellón beat the record of seasonal tickets in the fourth-tier division with 12,701, and is considered a giant amongst minnows. The presence of Villarreal CF in the adjacent town (only 8 km away) has created a fierce rivalry for geographical reasons, especially due to the success of Villarreal in the last decades.

The city is host to futsal club CFS Bisontes Castellón, which under the name Playas de Castellón was one of the best Spanish and European futsal clubs in the late 90s and early 2000s, having won the premier professional futsal league in Spain twice in 2000 and 2001, and the UEFA Futsal Cup three consecutive times in 2001, 2002 and 2003.

Education

Jaume I University was founded in 1991, and in 2014 there were approximately 15,000 students enrolled who share a single campus.

Twin towns
 Châtellerault, France
 Târgoviște, Romania
 Ube, Japan
 Lleida, Spain

Notable people
 Sergio Aragonés (born 1937), comics cartoonist.
 José Luis Ballester (born 1969), Olympic butterfly swimmer.
 Joan Barreda Bort (born 1983), Rally raid motorcyclist.
 Roberto Bautista-Agut (born 1988), professional tennis player.
 María Egual (1655–1735), poet and dramatist.
 Pablo Fornals (born 1996), professional footballer for West Ham United.
 Sergio García (born 1980), professional golfer.
 Pablo Hernandez Dominguez (born 1985), footballer, formerly with Valencia CF.
 Roberto Merhi, (born 1991), driver.
 Matilde Salvador (1918–2007), musician, composer and painter artist.
 Miguel Angel Silvestre, (born 1982), actor.
 Xavi Valero (born 1973), professional football goalkeeping coach.

Transport

The small Castellón Airport offers charter and general aviation services, as well as scheduled passenger services to London, Bucharest and Poznań. The new Castellón-Costa Azahar Airport is designed to support large international jet flights and was completed in 2011. It has become a symbol of the wasteful spending prior to the 2008–13 Spanish financial crisis.

The city is served by the Castellón de la Plana railway station. The Euromed railway line links Alicante to Barcelona.

Nowadays, the city has a new public transport called TRAM of Castellón which is a trolleybus. There is just one line, Línia 1 (TRAM of Castellón), but authorities are planning to build a second line.

See also
 Diocese of Segorbe-Castellón
 Columbretes Islands

Notes

References
Citations

Bibliography

External links 

 Castellón: A virtual trip
 Castellón de la Plana at Google Maps
 University James I of Castellón de la Plana
 News of Castellón. Noticias de Castellón
 News of CD Castellón.Soccer team. Noticias del CD Castellón
 News of Club Rugby Castellón.
 Festival music Arenal Sound
Meridian park

 
Municipalities in the Province of Castellón
Mediterranean port cities and towns in Spain
Plana Alta
Populated places in the Province of Castellón
Populated coastal places in Spain